Integrator complex subunit 7 is a protein that in humans is encoded by the INTS7 gene.

References

Further reading